The City of Mordialloc was a local government area about  south of Melbourne, the state capital of Victoria, Australia, on the eastern side of Port Phillip.

History

Mordialloc was originally part of the Shire of Moorabbin, and was severed and incorporated as the Borough of Mentone and Mordialloc on 26 May 1920. It increased in size on 18 May 1921, by absorbing another small section of Moorabbin. It was declared a town on 17 April 1923, and its name changed to Mordialloc a week later. It was proclaimed a city on 5 May 1926.

On 15 December 1994, the City of Mordialloc was abolished, and along with the City of Chelsea and parts of the Cities of Moorabbin, Oakleigh and Springvale, was merged into the newly created City of Kingston. The eastern section of Beaumaris was transferred to the newly created City of Bayside.

Council meetings were held at the Mentone Town Hall, on Mentone Parade, Mentone. It presently serves as a council service centre and library for the City of Kingston.

Wards

The City of Mordialloc was subdivided into three wards, each electing three councillors:
 Mentone Ward
 Parkdale Ward
 Mordialloc Ward

Suburbs
 Beaumaris (shared with the Cities of Moorabbin and Sandringham)
 Mentone* (shared with the City of Moorabbin)
 Mordialloc
 Parkdale

* Council seat.

Population

* Estimate in the 1958 Victorian Year Book.

References

External links
 Victorian Places - Mordialloc

Mordialloc
City of Bayside
1994 disestablishments in Australia
1920 establishments in Australia
City of Kingston (Victoria)